The Carpathian Mountains or Carpathians are a range of mountains forming an arc across Central Europe. The range stretches from the far eastern Czech Republic (3%) and Austria (1%) in the northwest through Slovakia (21%), Poland (10%), Ukraine (10%), Romania (50%) to Serbia (5%) in the south. The highest range within the Carpathians is known as the Tatra mountains in Slovakia, where the highest peaks exceed .

The divisions of the Carpathians usually involve three major sections:
 Western Carpathians: Austria, Czech Republic, Poland and Slovakia
 Eastern Carpathians: southeastern Poland, eastern Slovakia, Ukraine, and Romania
 Southern Carpathians: Romania and eastern Serbia

The term Outer Carpathians is frequently used to describe the northern rim of the Western and Eastern Carpathians.

The Carpathians provide habitat for the largest European populations of brown bears, wolves, chamois, and lynxes, with the highest concentration in Romania, as well as over one-third of all European plant species. The mountains and their foothills also have many thermal and mineral waters, with Romania having one-third of the European total. Romania is likewise home to the second-largest area of virgin forests in Europe after Russia, totaling 250,000 hectares (65%), most of them in the Carpathians, with the Southern Carpathians constituting Europe's largest unfragmented forest area. Deforestation rates due to illegal logging in the Carpathians are high.

Name

In modern times, the range is called Karpaty in Czech, Polish and Slovak and Карпати (Karpaty) in Ukrainian, Карпати / Karpati in Serbian, Carpați  in Romanian, Карпаты in Rusyn, Karpaten in German and Kárpátok in Hungarian. Although the toponym was recorded already by Ptolemy in the second century AD,  the modern form of the name is a neologism in most languages. For instance, Havasok ("Snowy Mountains") was its medieval Hungarian name; Russian chronicles referred to it as "Hungarian Mountains". Later sources, such as Dimitrie Cantemir and the Italian chronicler Giovanandrea Gromo, referred to the range as "Transylvania's Mountains", while the 17th-century historian Constantin Cantacuzino translated the name of the mountains in an Italian-Romanian glossary to "Rumanian Mountains".

The name "Carpates" is highly associated with the old Dacian tribes called "Carpes" or "Carpi" who lived in a large area from the east, northeast of the Black Sea to the Transylvanian Plain on the present day Romania and Moldova. The name Carpates may ultimately be from the Proto Indo-European root *sker-/*ker-, which meant mountain, rock, or rugged (cf. Germanic root *skerp-, Old Norse  "harrow", Gothic skarpo, Middle Low German scharf "potsherd", and Modern High German Scherbe "shard", Old English  and English sharp, Lithuanian kar~pas "cut, hack, notch", Latvian cìrpt "to shear, clip"). The archaic Polish word karpa meant 'rugged irregularities, underwater obstacles/rocks, rugged roots, or trunks'. The more common word skarpa means a sharp cliff or other vertical terrain. The name may instead come from Indo-European * 'to turn', akin to Old English  'to turn, change' (English warp) and Greek   'wrist', perhaps referring to the way the mountain range bends or veers in an L-shape. A presumed association with Albanian karpë 'rocky hill with a sharp peak' is dubious. however, it is supported by Eichner, as well as by Eqrem Çabej as deriving from possible Proto-Albanian karpātai, meaning mountainous place, compare Beskids

In late Roman documents, the Eastern Carpathian Mountains were referred to as Montes Sarmatici (meaning Sarmatian Mountains). The Western Carpathians were called Carpates, a name that is first recorded in Ptolemy's Geographia (second century AD).

In the Scandinavian Hervarar saga, which relates ancient Germanic legends about battles between Goths and Huns, the name Karpates appears in the predictable Germanic form as Harvaða fjöllum (see Grimm's law).

"Inter Alpes Huniae et Oceanum est Polonia" ("Between the Hunic Alps and the ocean lies Poland") by Gervase of Tilbury, has described in his Otia Imperialia ("Recreation for an Emperor") in 1211. Thirteenth- to fifteenth-century Hungarian documents named the mountains Thorchal, Tarczal, or less frequently Montes Nivium ("Snowy Mountains").

Geography 

The northwestern Carpathians begin in Slovakia and southern Poland. They surround Transcarpathia and Transylvania in a large semicircle, sweeping towards the southeast, and end on the Danube near Orșova in Romania. The highest altitudes of the Carpathians occur where they are widest.

Although commonly referred to as a mountain chain, the Carpathians do not actually form an uninterrupted chain of mountains. Rather, they consist of several orographically and geologically distinctive groups, presenting as great a structural variety as the Alps. It was believed that no area of the Carpathian range was covered in snow all year round and there were no glaciers, but recent research by Polish scientists discovered one permafrost and glacial area in the Tatra Mountains. 

The Carpathians at their highest altitude are only as high as the middle region of the Alps, with which they share a common appearance, climate, and flora.  The Carpathians are separated from the Alps by the Danube. The two ranges meet at only one point: the Leitha Mountains at Bratislava. The river also separates them from the Balkan Mountains at Orșova in Romania. The valley of the March and Oder separates the Carpathians from the Silesian and Moravian chains, which belong to the middle wing of the great Central Mountain System of Europe. Unlike the other wings of the system, the Carpathians, which form the watershed between the northern seas and the Black Sea, are surrounded on all sides by plains, namely the Pannonian plain to the southwest, the Lower Danubian Plain to the south, with the southern part being in Bulgaria, and the northern - in (Romania), and the Galician plain to the northeast.

Cities and towns

Important cities and towns in or near the Carpathians are, in approximate descending order of population:

 Kraków (Poland)
 Bratislava (Slovakia)
 Cluj-Napoca (Romania)
 Chernivtsi (Ukraine)
 Brașov (Romania)
 Košice (Slovakia)
 Ivano-Frankivsk (Ukraine)
 Oradea (Romania)
 Bielsko-Biała (Poland)
 Miskolc (Hungary)
 Sibiu (Romania)
 Târgu Mureș (Romania)
 Baia Mare (Romania)
 Uzhhorod (Ukraine)
 Tarnów (Poland)
 Râmnicu Vâlcea (Romania)
 Prešov (Slovakia)
 Mukachevo (Ukraine)
 Drohobych (Ukraine)
 Piatra Neamț (Romania)
 Nowy Sącz (Poland)
 Suceava (Romania)
 Vršac (Serbia)
 Târgu Jiu (Romania)
 Drobeta-Turnu Severin (Romania)
 Reșița (Romania)
 Žilina (Slovakia)
 Bistrița (Romania)
 Banská Bystrica (Slovakia)
 Zvolen (Slovakia)
 Deva (Romania)
 Zlín (Czech Republic)
 Hunedoara (Romania)
 Martin (Slovakia)
 Zalău (Romania)
 Przemyśl (Poland)
 Krosno (Poland)
 Sanok (Poland)
 Alba Iulia (Romania)
 Sfântu Gheorghe (Romania)
 Turda (Romania)
 Mediaș (Romania)
 Poprad (Slovakia)
 Spišská Nová Ves (Slovakia)
 Petroșani (Romania)
 Miercurea Ciuc (Romania)
 Făgăraș (Romania)
 Odorheiu Secuiesc (Romania)
 Boryslav (Ukraine)
 Jasło (Poland)
 Cieszyn (Poland)
 Nowy Targ (Poland)
 Żywiec (Poland)
 Zakopane (Poland)
 Petrila (Romania)
 Cugir (Romania)
 Târgu Neamț (Romania)
 Câmpulung Moldovenesc (Romania)
 Gheorgheni (Romania)
 Rakhiv (Ukraine)
 Vatra Dornei (Romania)
 Rabka-Zdrój (Poland)
 Bor (Serbia)

Highest peaks

Highest peaks by country
This is a list of the highest national peaks of the Carpathians, their heights, geologic divisions, and locations. Excluding mountains located in two countries (on the border).

Mountain passes
In the Romanian part of the main chain of the Carpathians, mountain passes include Prislop Pass, Tihuța Pass, Bicaz Canyon, Ghimeș Pass, Buzău Pass, Predeal Pass (crossed by the railway from Brașov to Bucharest), Turnu Roșu Pass (1,115 ft., running through the narrow gorge of the Olt River and crossed by the railway from Sibiu to Bucharest), Vulcan Pass, and the Iron Gate (both crossed by the railway from Timișoara to Craiova).

Geology 

The area now occupied by the Carpathians was once occupied by smaller ocean basins. The Carpathian mountains were formed during the Alpine orogeny in the Mesozoic and Tertiary by moving the ALCAPA (Alpine-Carpathian-Pannonian), Tisza and Dacia plates over subducting oceanic crust.
The mountains take the form of a fold and thrust belt with generally north vergence in the western segment, northeast to east vergence in the eastern portion and southeast vergence in the southern portion. Currently, the area is the most seismically active in Central Europe.

The external, generally northern, portion of the orogenic belt is a Tertiary accretionary wedge of a so-called Flysch belt (the Carpathian Flysch Belt) created by rocks scraped off the sea bottom and thrust over the North-European plate. The Carpathian accretionary wedge is made of several thin skinned nappes composed of Cretaceous to Paleogene turbidites. Thrusting of the Flysch nappes over the Carpathian foreland caused the formation of the Carpathian foreland basin. The boundary between the Flysch belt and internal zones of the orogenic belt in the western segment of the mountain range is marked by the Pieniny Klippen Belt, a narrow complicated zone of polyphase compressional deformation, later involved in a supposed strike-slip zone. Internal zones in western and eastern segments contain older Variscan igneous massifs reworked in Mesozoic thick and thin-skinned nappes. During the Middle Miocene this zone was affected by intensive calc-alkaline arc volcanism that developed over the subduction zone of the flysch basins. At the same time, the internal zones of the orogenic belt were affected by large extensional structure of the back-arc Pannonian Basin. The last volcanic activity occurred at Ciomadul about 30,000 years ago.

The mountains started to gain their current shape from the latest Miocene onward. The slopes of the Carphartian contain at some locations solifluction deposits. 

Iron, gold and silver were found in great quantities in the Western Carpathians. After the Roman emperor Trajan's conquest of Dacia, he brought back to Rome over 165 tons of gold and 330 tons of silver.

Ecology

The ecology of the Carpathians varies with altitude, ranging from lowland forests to alpine meadows. Foothill forests are primarily of broadleaf deciduous trees, including oak, hornbeam, and linden. European beech is characteristic of the montane forest zone. Higher-elevation subalpine forests are characterized by Norway spruce (Picea abies). Krummholz and alpine meadows occur above the treeline.

Wildlife in the Carpathians includes brown bear (Ursus arctos), wolf (Canis lupus), Eurasian lynx (Lynx lynx), European wildcat (Felis silvestris), Tatra chamois (Rupicapra rupicapra tatrica), European bison (Bison bonasus), and golden eagle (Aquila chrysaetos).

Divisions of the Carpathians

The largest range is the Tatras in Slovakia and Poland. A major part of the western and northeastern Outer Eastern Carpathians in Poland, Ukraine, and Slovakia is traditionally called the Eastern Beskids.

The geological border between the Western and Eastern Carpathians runs approximately along the line (south to north) between the towns of Michalovce, Bardejov, Nowy Sącz and Tarnów. In older systems the border runs more in the east, along the line (north to south) along the rivers San and Osława (Poland), the town of Snina (Slovakia) and river Tur'ia (Ukraine). Biologists shift the border even further to the east.

The border between the eastern and southern Carpathians is formed by the Predeal Pass, south of Brașov and the Prahova Valley.

In geopolitical terms, Carpathian Mountains are often grouped and labeled according to national or regional borders, but such division has turned out to be relative, since it was, and still is dependent on frequent historical, political and administrative changes of national or regional borders. According to modern geopolitical division, Carpathians can be grouped as: Serbian, Romanian, Ukrainian, Polish, Slovakian, Czech and Austrian. Within each nation, specific classifications of the Carpathians have been developing, often reflecting local traditions, and thus creating terminological diversity, that produces various challenges in the fields of comparative classification and international systematization.

The section of the Carpathians within the borders of Romania is commonly known as the Romanian Carpathians. In local use, Romanians sometimes denote as "Eastern Carpathians" only the Romanian part of the Eastern Carpathians, which lies on their territory (i.e., from the Ukrainian border or from the Prislop Pass to the south), which they subdivide into three simplified geographical groups (northern, central, southern), instead of Outer and Inner Eastern Carpathians. These groups are:
 Maramureș-Bukovinian Carpathians (Romanian: Carpații Maramureșului și ai Bucovinei)
 Moldavian-Transylvanian Carpathians (Romanian: Carpații Moldo-Transilvani)
 Curvature Carpathians (Romanian: Carpații Curburii, Carpații de Curbură)

The section of the Carpathians within the borders of Ukraine is commonly known as the Ukrainian Carpathians. Classification of eastern sections of the Carpathians is particularly complex, since it was influenced by several overlapping traditions. Terms like
Wooded Carpathians, Poloniny Mountains or Eastern Beskids are often used in varying scopes by authors belonging to different traditions.

See also

 
 
 
 Tourism in Poland
 Tourism in Serbia
 Tourism in Romania
 Tourism in Slovakia
 Tourism in Ukraine
 Sudetes
 The Living Fire

References

Sources

External links

 Encyclopedia of Ukraine, vol. 1 — Carpathian Mountains, by Volodymyr Kubijovyč (1984).
 Carpathianconvention.org: The Framework Convention for the Protection and Sustainable Development of the Carpathians
 Orographic map highlighting Carpathian mountains
 Alpinet.org: Romanian mountain guide
 Carpati.org: Romanian mountain guide
 Pgi.gov.pl: Oil and Gas Fields in the Carpathians
 Video: Beautiful mountains Carpathians, Ukraine

01
Mountain ranges of Europe
Mountain ranges of the Czech Republic
Mountain ranges of Hungary
Mountain ranges of Poland
Mountain ranges of Romania
Mountain ranges of Slovakia
Mountain ranges of Ukraine
Geography of Central Europe
Geography of Eastern Europe
Geography of Southeastern Europe
Saga locations
Physiographic provinces